Farmers Electric Cooperative may refer to:

Farmers Electric Cooperative (Arkansas)
Farmers Electric Cooperative (Texas)
Farmers Electric Cooperative (New Mexico)